The Davidson Academy is a school for profoundly gifted students with two accredited options – an online campus for students living anywhere in the United States and Canada and a Reno, Nevada, public school located on the University of Nevada, Reno, campus for students living in the area. The school, founded in 2006, is the first public school of its kind in the nation for profoundly gifted (high IQ) students. The Reno public school is located in the Jot Travis Building on the campus of the University of Nevada, Reno. As of the 2021-2022 school year, 144 students are enrolled in the Davidson Academy Reno campus and 98 students are enrolled through the online campus.  The Davidson Academy provides each student with a personalized learning plan, designed to educate them and specifically catered to their individual, unique needs. Unlike traditional school settings, the academy's classes do not group students by age, but by ability. The school is designed to provide an educational setting where the abilities, strengths, and interests of highly intelligent young people are encouraged and supported. Eligible candidates must score in the 99.9th percentile on accepted intelligence and/or achievement tests; perform at a required academic level; exhibit intellectual and academic achievement; are, or intend to be, residents of Nevada; and other criteria.  As ranked by the Washington Post Jay Mathews, the Davidson Academy is one of the nation's "Top-performing schools with elite students". The academy was also named the top school in Nevada by MSN.com and academy students scored at the top on state tests.

The average class ratio of students to teachers is currently about 4:1. The academy's directors are Colleen Harsin (Reno campus) and Stacy Hawthorne, Ed.D. (online campus).

In 2017-2018, the academy launched an online option. For the most-up-to-date information, see the online campus section of the academy's website.

The school is a division of the Davidson Institute for Talent Development, a national nonprofit organization established by the Davidsons to  support the needs of profoundly gifted children through information resources, networking and educational opportunities, family support, advocacy, and scholarships.

History
The academy's Reno campus was created following state legislation that passed in 2005 allowing the creation of a "university school for profoundly gifted pupils". The Davidsons decided to create the academy as an outgrowth of the Davidson Young Scholar program, upon requests by many of the parents asking them to start a school and saying they would move for their students to attend. A full-time online campus for the Davidson Academy was launched for the 2017-2018 academic year. The online option provides profoundly gifted students across the United States and Canada a "rigorous online academic environment where these students can thrive among their intellectual peers."

Awards and honors
Consistently ranked as one of the nation's "Top-performing schools with elite students" by the Washington Post Jay Mathews.
Ranked #1 Public High School in Nevada by msn.com
24 Davidson Academy students were named 2020 National Merit Scholarship semifinalists.
2016 Winners of the Nevada Science Bowl.
19 National Merit semifinalists in 2016-2017, one National Merit winner in 2015-2016.
One Presidential Scholar each in 2014, 2015, 2016, and 2020, and two Presidential Scholars in 2017.
The Davidson Academy Mathcounts Team took first place in the state competition for Mathcounts.
The Davidson Academy's International Public Policy Forum team placed in the top eight internationally in 2016-2017, 2017-2018, and 2021-2022.

Notable alumni
Taylor Wilson (born 1994), nuclear scientist and youngest person to build a working Farnsworth–Hirsch fusor.

References

External links

Davidson Institute for Talent Development
Davidson Academy YouTube channel
Davidson Academy Twitter
Davidson Academy Facebook

High schools in Reno, Nevada
Public high schools in Nevada